Richard Earle "Earl" Johnson (March 10, 1891 in Woodstock, Virginia – November 19, 1965) was an American athlete who competed mainly in the cross country team.  He was the 1921 National Champion.  He effectively defended his championship in 1922 as he was beaten by Ville Ritola's Van Cortlandt Park course record, but since Ritola was Finnish, Johnson was the first American finisher in the National Championships.  A rare black athlete of his day, he worked for the Edgar Thomson Steel Works in Pittsburgh, Pennsylvania.

He competed for the United States in the 1924 Summer Olympics held in Paris, France in the cross country team where he won the silver medal with his teammates Arthur Studenroth and August Fager.

References

1891 births
1965 deaths
People from Woodstock, Virginia
Track and field athletes from Virginia
American male long-distance runners
Athletes (track and field) at the 1920 Summer Olympics
Athletes (track and field) at the 1924 Summer Olympics
Olympic silver medalists for the United States in track and field
Olympic bronze medalists for the United States in track and field
Medalists at the 1924 Summer Olympics
African-American male track and field athletes
Olympic cross country runners
20th-century African-American sportspeople
African-American sportsmen